The Lewis Falls are located on the Lewis River in Yellowstone National Park, Wyoming, United States. The falls are on the Lewis River, just south of Lewis Lake.

See also

 Waterfalls in Yellowstone National Park

Notes

Waterfalls of Teton County, Wyoming
Waterfalls of Yellowstone National Park
Waterfalls of Wyoming